Arul is a 2004 Indian Tamil-language action drama film written and directed by Hari starring Vikram, Jyothika, Pasupathy, Kollam Thulasi, and Vadivelu, among others. The music is composed by Harris Jayaraj. The story tells how a man is rejected by his family but then finds his way back.

Premise
Arul, who works in a mill is the third son of four brothers in a family of goldsmiths in Coimbatore. Once, Arul's brother steals a chain due to financial circumstances. Arul took the blame and was labelled as a thief, where he was seen as a black sheep by his father Bala Aasari. Thus, he vows never to make a gold ornament ever again. Kanmani, who moves into his neighbourhood eventually falls for Arul. However, Arul does not reciprocate. When Bala scolds Arul at a family gathering, Kanmani stands up for him causing Bala to insult her. Soon, Arul marries Kanmani. The setting up of the party office of the ruling party forces Arul to lock horns with MLA Gajapathy, along with his brother and party leader Sethupathy.

Cast

Production
After the success of Saamy, Hari decided to renew the collaboration with Vikram for second time with Arul.
Jyothika was selected as heroine pairing with Vikram for second time after Dhool. Vivek was originally a part of the cast but fell out with the director and was subsequently replaced by Vadivelu in the film.

Though the film's plot is set in set in the backdrop of Coimbatore, the film was entirely shot at Karaikudi and was completed within 45 days.

Music

The soundtrack album and background score were composed by Harris Jayaraj collaborating with Hari and Vikram for the third time.

Release

Critical reception
The film received positive to mixed reviews. Nowrunning stated the film as "long, stale, tedious and drab". Sify wrote:"If you like Rambo style of films, Arul is worth investing". The film failed to impress the urban audience due to logic glitches but was well received in rural areas.

References

External links
 

2004 films
2000s masala films
2000s Tamil-language films
Films set in Tamil Nadu
Films shot in Tamil Nadu
Films directed by Hari (director)
Films scored by Harris Jayaraj
Indian action films
2004 action films